The following character image albums are from the anime series School Rumble.  Each largely follows the same track layout, and has songs sung by the voice actors for the respective character and drama tracks including other characters' voice actors.  Seven of the albums are for female characters: the female protagonist Tenma Tsukamoto, the supporting characters Yakumo Tsukamoto, Mikoto Suo, Eri Sawachika, and Akira Takano, and two minor characters, Karen Ichijou and Sarah Adiemus. The male protagonist of the series, Kenji Harima, is the only male character to have an image album, making a total of eight.

Tenma Tsukamoto

 is the first character image album.

Track listing

Yakumo Tsukamoto

 is the second character image album.

Track listing

Mikoto Suou

 is the third character image album.

Track listing

Eri Sawachika

 is the fourth character image album.  There are two versions, a Limited Edition and a Regular Edition.

Track listing

Akira Takano

 is the fifth character image album.

Track listing

Karen Ichijou

 is the sixth character image album.

Track listing

♯00: Title Call
毎日がRendez-vous
♯01: 巌流島
♯02: TRY
BGM集(1) (M 3,M 5,M 8)
ミニドラマ1~5
BGM集(2) (M 14,M 20)
スキダカラ。
(CM)
(予告)
毎日がRendezvous (Off Vocal Version)
スキダカラ。(Off Vocal Version)
スクランブル・ショック!!

Sarah Adiemus

 is the seventh character image album.

Track listing

00: Title Call
Best Friend(福井裕佳梨)
01: ヴァンパイア
02: 寡黙な女神
BGM集 (M 15・M 16)
ミニドラマ
BGM集 (M 17・M 18)
Loving you
CM
予告
Best Friend (Off Vocal Version)
Loving you (Off Vocal Version)
スクランブル・ショック!!

Kenji Harima

 is the eighth character image album.  There are two versions, a Limited Edition and a Regular Edition.

Track listing

00: Title Call
銀河沿線 ’05(高橋広樹)
01: トゥルー・ホリデー
02: 恋は舞い降りた
破天荒ロボ ドジビロンのテーマ
ミニドラマ1~5
海の男はよ
CM
予告
銀河沿線 ’05 (Off Vocal Version)
破天荒ロボ ドジビロンのテーマ (Off Vocal Version)
海の男はよ(Off Vocal Version)
スクランブル・ショック!!

Notes

References

School Rumble
Character image albums
Film and television discographies
Discographies of Japanese artists